Polytremis lubricans, the contiguous swift, is a butterfly belonging to the family Hesperiidae. It is found in the Indomalayan realm.

Subspecies
Polytremis lubricans lubricans (Tibet, India, Indo-China, Yunnan, Malay Peninsula, Sumatra, Java, Borneo, Philippines, Sulawesi, Sangihe, Banggai, Sula)
Polytremis lubricans taiwana   Matsumura, 1919   (Taiwan, Anhui, Yunnan)

Description

Frederic Moore (1878) gives a detailed description for Hesperia toona:

Biology
The larva on feeds on Imperata, Microstegium, Miscanthus

References

Hesperiinae
Butterflies of Asia
Butterflies of Singapore
Butterflies of Indochina